Evex may refer to:
 Esterified estrogens, by brand name
 EVEX prefix